William Everett Schluter (November 5, 1927 – August 6, 2018) was an American Republican Party politician from New Jersey, who served in both houses of the New Jersey Legislature in two separate instances.

Early life and career
Schluter was born on November 5, 1927, in Bronxville, New York to Frederic E. and Charlotte M. Schluter. He grew up in Princeton, New Jersey and attended Phillips Exeter Academy and Princeton University, where he played on the hockey team. In 1950 he married Nancy Albright Hurd. They settled in Pennington, New Jersey.

Schluter was elected to the Pennington Borough Council in 1963 and served for six years. He was a delegate to the 1964 Republican National Convention for Barry Goldwater.

New Jersey Legislature
Schluter ran an unsuccessful campaign for the New Jersey Senate in 1965 against Sido L. Ridolfi in the 6th Legislative District encompassing all of Mercer County. However two years later, he was elected to the New Jersey General Assembly from District 6A (encompassing Mercer County outside of Trenton and Ewing) and was reelected in 1969.

In 1970, Schluter was appointed to the New Jersey Election Law Revision Commission, which produced a landmark report in 1975 recommending ways to reform New Jersey's election laws and curb political corruption. Schluter later wrote in 2017, "This report and the work of the Commission inspired me to take up the banner of reform, which has been the backbone of my political career ever since."

In 1971, in a newly reapportioned legislative district combining parts of Mercer County and all of Hunterdon County, Schluter was elected to the New Jersey Senate. However two years later in 1973 in a new 14th district encompassing Mercer, Hunterdon, Middlesex, and Morris counties, Schluter lost the seat in 1973 to Anne Clark Martindell, as Democrats took control of the State Legislature in the wake of the Watergate scandal.

In 1976 Schluter ran for a seat in the United States House of Representatives from the 13th congressional district against the Democratic incumbent, Helen Stevenson Meyner, who like Martindell, had won in a Republican-leaning district in the aftermath of Watergate. In the hotly contested race, Meyner defeated Schluter by a narrow margin. In 1978 Schluter ran for the House seat again but lost in the Republican primary to Jim Courter, who went on to defeat Meyner in the general election.

Schluter returned to the New Jersey Legislature in 1987, when Dick Zimmer moved from the Assembly to the Senate following the death of Senator Walter E. Foran. Schluter won a special election Zimmer's Assembly seat in the 23rd district, and then was appointed to the State Senate after Zimmer succeeded Courter in the House of Representatives in 1991. Schluter's Assembly seat was filled by Leonard Lance.

Gubernatorial bid and later career
Schluter served in the State Senate until 2001, when he would have had to run against a fellow incumbent, Democratic Senator Shirley Turner, due to redistricting. Instead, he ran as an independent in the race for Governor of New Jersey, with the help of Doug Friedline, the former campaign manager of Governor Jesse Ventura of Minnesota. The relationship brought an endorsement from Gov. Jesse Ventura of Minnesota. However a few weeks later, on September 11, 2001 the attack on the World Trade Center in New York City caused an immediate cessation of political campaigning in New Jersey, and supporters diverted their otherwise campaign contributions to disaster relief organizations. This prevented Schluter from raising sufficient funds to qualify in the gubernatorial televised debates. By the time the race restarted, Schluter lagged far behind Democrat Jim McGreevey and Republican Brett Schundler, and garnered only 1% of the vote.

Schluter was appointed to the State Ethics Commission in 2006 by Governor Jon Corzine. He was a resident of Pennington, New Jersey. Schluter remained somewhat active in New Jersey politics. He was the author of a book, Soft Corruption: How Unethical Conduct Undermines Good Government and What To Do About It, published in spring 2017 by Rutgers University Press.

Schluter died on August 6, 2018 in his Pennington home following complications from pancreatic cancer of which he had been diagnosed for two years.

References

External links
New Jersey Legislature - Senator William E. Schluter (R) (Archived version from November 9, 2001)

1927 births
2018 deaths
New Jersey city council members
Republican Party New Jersey state senators
People from Bronxville, New York
People from Princeton, New Jersey
People from Pennington, New Jersey
Phillips Exeter Academy alumni
Politicians from Mercer County, New Jersey
Princeton University alumni
Republican Party members of the New Jersey General Assembly
New Jersey Independents
Deaths from pancreatic cancer
Deaths from cancer in New Jersey